Afton Township is one of nineteen townships in DeKalb County, Illinois, USA. As of the 2010 census, its population was 861 and it contained 372 housing units.

History
Afton Township was formed from portions of DeKalb Township and Clinton Township on February 18, 1856. The township derives its name from the poem Sweet Afton by Robert Burns.

Geography

Cities, towns, villages
 Dekalb (partial)

Unincorporated towns
 Afton Center at 
 Elva at 
 McGirr at

Cemeteries
 Afton Center Cemetery.

Airports and landing strips
 Jack W Watson Airport
 Walter Airport

Demographics

School districts
 DeKalb Community Unit School District 428
 Hinckley-Big Rock Community Unit School District 429
 Indian Creek Community Unit School District 425

Political districts
 Illinois's 14th congressional district
 State House District 70
 State Senate District 35

References
 
 US Census Bureau 2009 TIGER/Line Shapefiles
 US National Atlas

External links
 City-Data.com
 Illinois State Archives
 Township Officials of Illinois
 History of Afton

Townships in DeKalb County, Illinois
Populated places established in 1856
Townships in Illinois